Megan Lynn Brigman (born November 7, 1990) is an American former soccer defender who played for Seattle Reign FC of the National Women's Soccer League.

Early life
Born and raised in Laurinburg, North Carolina. Brigman attended Scotland High School where she was named female athlete of the year her junior and senior years.

University of North Carolina
Brigman attended the University of North Carolina at Chapel Hill from 2009 to 2013 where she played soccer for the Tar Heels.

Brigman worked her way into the starting lineup after Rachel Given suffered an injury in the 2010 season. Brigman stepped up to replace the valuable senior and remained in the backline for the remainder of the 2010 season, starting in 23 games. Brigman followed up by starting in 20 games in the 2011 season. The UNC coaches consider her one of the most improved players on the team over the course of career.

Playing career

Club

Seattle Reign FC
On January 17, 2014, Brigman was selected in the second round (17th overall pick) of the 2014 NWSL College Draft by Seattle Reign FC. In March, the Reign signed her to the team. Of her signing, head coach Laura Harvey said, "Megan was someone that we watched carefully last season and hoped would be available with our second pick. She has done very well in preseason training and we believe she has the potential to develop into a successful professional player." She made her first appearance for the club during the team's 2–0 win against Boston Breakers on June 19, 2014. The Reign finished first in the regular season clinching the NWSL Shield for the first time. After defeating the Washington Spirit 2–1 in the playoff semi-finals, the Reign were defeated 2–1 by FC Kansas City during the championship final. Brigman finished the 2014 season with two caps for the Reign.

The Seattle Reign FC waived Megan Brigman after one season. General manager and head coach, Laura Harvey said, "Despite the limited minutes she played last season, Megan was an important part of our squad. Given the increased depth of our squad this season we felt her chances would be further limited, which lead to the decision to waive Megan." Brigman only played 17 minutes in 2 games during the 2014 NWSL season.

Post-soccer life 
After one season with the Seattle Reign in 2014, Brigman retired from her soccer career. She began working in sports marketing. In October 2015, Megan began working as an intern for French West Vaughan.

See also

 List of University of North Carolina at Chapel Hill alumni

References

External links
 North Carolina Tar Heels player profile
 

Living people
1990 births
American women's soccer players
OL Reign players
National Women's Soccer League players
Soccer players from North Carolina
North Carolina Tar Heels women's soccer players
Women's association football defenders
OL Reign draft picks
People from Laurinburg, North Carolina